The Visual Effects Society Award for Outstanding Model in a Photoreal or Animated Project is one of the annual awards given by the Visual Effects Society. The award goes to artists whose work in models, miniatures, have been deemed worthy of recognition. Originally, the award was given separately to artists in both film and television, with the categories "Best Models and Miniatures in a Motion Picture" and "Best Models and Miniatures in a Televised Program, Music Video or Commercial". In 2004, there was only one category, recognizing only work in motion pictures with "Outstanding Models and Miniatures in a Motion Picture". In 2005, television was honored, once again, with "Outstanding Models and Miniatures in a Broadcast Program, Commercial or Music Video". Television series and/or televised content (commercials, specials, etc.) would be honored, intermittently, until 2015, when the category was redesigned to honor any motion media project. It has continued to do so since then.

Winners and nominees

2000s
Best Models and Miniatures in a Motion Picture

Outstanding Models and Miniatures in a Feature Motion Picture

Best Models and Miniatures in a Televised Program, Music Video, or Commercial

Outstanding Models and Miniatures in a Broadcast Program, Commercial, or Music Video

Outstanding Models and Miniatures in a Broadcast Program or Commercial

2010s
Outstanding Models and Miniatures in a Feature Motion Picture

Outstanding Models and Miniatures in a Broadcast Program or Commercial

Outstanding Models in Any Motion Media Project

Outstanding Models in a Photoreal or Animated Project

Outstanding Model in a Photoreal or Animated Project

2020s

Superlatives

Films with Multiple Nominations
2 Nominations
 Pirates of the Caribbean: The Curse of the Black Pearl
 Rogue One: A Star Wars Story

Programs with Multiple Nominations
3 Nominations
 The Mandalorian

2 Nominations
 Battlestar Galactica
 Boardwalk Empire

External links
 Visual Effects Society

References

M